Bajaj  is a village in Bhulath Tehsil in Kapurthala district of Punjab State, India. The village is administrated by a Sarpanch, who is an elected representative.

Demography 
According to the report published by Census India in 2011,Bajaj has 260 houses with the total population of 1,254 persons of which 645 are male and 609 females. Literacy rate of Bajaj is 80.02%, higher than the state average of 75.84%.  The population of children in the age group 0–6 years is 113 which is 9.01% of the total population.  Child sex ratio is approximately 915, higher than the state average of 846.

Population data 

As per census 2011, 343 people were engaged in work activities out of the total population of Bajaj which includes 307 males and 36 females. According to census survey report 2011,  87.46% workers (Employment or Earning more than 6 Months) describe their work as main work and 12.54% workers are involved in Marginal activity providing livelihood for less than 6 months.

Caste 
The village has schedule caste (SC) constitutes 32.93% of total population of the village and it doesn't have any Schedule Tribe (ST) population.

References

List of cities near the village 
Bhulath
Kapurthala 
Phagwara 
Sultanpur Lodhi

Air travel connectivity 
The closest International airport to the village is Sri Guru Ram Dass Jee International Airport.

External links
 Villages in Kapurthala
 List of Villages in Kapurthala Tehsil

Villages in Kapurthala district